The Church of the Society of Jesus may refer to:

Churches
 Church of the Society of Jesus (Cusco, Peru)
 Church of the Society of Jesus (Quito, Ecuador)